Cleverdale is a hamlet in Warren County, New York, United States. Cleverdale has a post office with ZIP code 12820.

References

Hamlets in Warren County, New York
Hamlets in New York (state)